Year 1329 (MCCCXXIX) was a common year starting on Sunday (link will display the full calendar) of the Julian calendar.

Events

January–December 
 February 1 – King John of Bohemia (of the Teutonic Order) captures Medvėgalis, an important fortress of the pagan Grand Duchy of Lithuania, and baptizes 6,000 of its defenders.
 February 18 – Amda Seyon I, Emperor of Ethiopia, begins his campaigns in the southern Muslim provinces (possibly in 1332).
 March 27 – Pope John XXII condemns some teachings of Meister Eckhart as heretical.
 April – Antipope Nicholas V is excommunicated by Pope John XXII.
 June 6 – Edward III of England pays homage to Philip VI of France for Aquitaine.
 June 7 – David II becomes King of Scots at age 5; he will rule Scotland for nearly 42 years.
 June 10 – Braganstown massacre, County Louth, Ireland: Over 160 are killed.
 June 11 – Battle of Maltepe (Pelekanon): Ottoman Turks defeat the Byzantine Empire.

Date unknown 
 Aimone of Savoy becomes Count of Savoy.
 Construction begins on the Archcathedral Basilica of the Assumption of the Blessed Virgin Mary and Saint Andrew in Frombork, Poland.
 Amberg, Germany, passes to the House of Wittelsbach.
 Michael of Cesena is deposed as General of the Franciscans.
 Stefan Uroš IV Dušan of Serbia defeats Stephen II, Ban of Bosnia.
 Wiesbaden is granted the right of coinage by Louis IV, Holy Roman Emperor.

Births 
 September 26 – Anne of Bavaria, queen consort of Bohemia (d. 1353)
 November 22 – Elisabeth of Meissen, Burgravine consort of Nuremberg (d. 1375)
 November 29 – John I, Duke of Bavaria (d. 1340)
 date unknown
 Fairuzabadi, Persian Arab lexicographer (d. 1414)
 Prince Lazar of Serbia (d. 1389)
 Philip II, Prince of Taranto (d. 1374)
 Hosokawa Yoriyuki, Japanese samurai (d. 1392)

Deaths 
 January 17 – Saint Roseline, Carthusian nun (b. 1263)
 April 21 – Frederick IV, Duke of Lorraine (b. 1282)
 May 9 – John Drokensford, Bishop of Bath and Wells
 May 31 – Albertino Mussato, Italian statesman and writer (b. 1261)
 June 7 – Robert the Bruce, King of Scotland (b. 1274)
 August 30 – Khutughtu Khan, Emperor Mingzong of Yuan, emperor of the Yuan dynasty and the Mongol Empire (b. 1300)
 October 27 – Mahaut, Countess of Artois (b. 1268)
 date unknown
 Walter Herok, Bishop of Aberdeen
 Michael of Imereti
 Oshin of Korikos, regent of Armenia (assassinated)
 Edward, Count of Savoy (b. 1284)
 Maol Íosa IV, Earl of Strathearn

References